Juan José Ballesta Muñoz, also known as Juanjo Ballesta (born 12 November 1987) is a Spanish actor.

Biography 
Born on 12 November 1987 in Parla, Ballesta grew up in Toledo. He had his debut performance in television in 1997, starring in the series Querido maestro. He later joined the cast of the TV series Compañeros, playing the role of Emilio Rubio Viñé for 10 episodes. He won fame and a Goya Award for Best New Actor for El Bola (2000), his debut performance in a feature film.

He has performed in more than sixteen, since 1997, until his career declined after 2010.

Selected filmography
Film

Television

Awards
 Goya award for Best New Actor (2000)

References

External links
 

1987 births
Living people
Spanish male film actors
Male actors from Madrid
21st-century Spanish male actors
Spanish male child actors
People from Parla